Suavito (foaled 21/08/2010) is a retired Thoroughbred racehorse formally trained by Nigel Blackiston at Flemington Racecourse. She was bred in New Zealand by IDL Racing Ltd, and was raced throughout her entire career in Australia. She was a multiple group winner and won over $1,000,000 in prize money.

Career 
Suavito kicked off her career in a 3 year old maiden race at Ballarat over 1100m where she finished second to Solicit, a horse that went on to be a multiple group winning horse. Early in her career it was clear how talented she was, winning her second start, and going on to dominantly win her first city race at Caulfield Racecourse at just her 4th career start.

In her second preparation, in autumn 2014, Suavito placed first-up at Group 2 level. She went on the finish a close second to Marianne in the Listed Alexandra Stakes at Moonee Valley, followed by 7th and 6th placings in the Group 1 Vinery Stud Stakes and ATC (Australian Turf Club) Oaks respectively.

In her third preparation, spring 2014, Suavito kicked off with a win first-up over 1400m at Caulfield, displaying a great turn of foot. Weeks later, she controversially remained in the barriers at Flemington in the Group 2 Blazer Stakes. After this mishap, Suavito went on to win her first Black-type race in the Group 3 F&M Tesio Stakes at Moonee Valley. Two weeks later, on Emirates Stakes Day, Suavito won the Group 2 F&M  Matriarch Stakes at Flemington.

After finishing her 2014 spring campaign with two wins in a row, Suavito started her third preparation in great form, defeating Smokin' Joey and Dissident (The 2014/2015 Horse Of The Year) first up over 1400m at  Caulfield in the Group 1  Futurity Stakes. She soon made it 4 wins in a row after winning the Group 2 Blamey Stakes in dominant fashion. Her preparation finished after just three starts, with a 7th placing in the Group 1  Doncaster Mile over 1600m at  Royal Randwick.

In Spring 2015, Suavito suffered a minor bone chip injury, which required surgery, this would mean she would  miss the 2015 Spring Carnival, in arguably the best form of her career.

After a 45-week spell, including the surgery and recovery of her bone chip injury, Suavito returned in autumn 2016, running in the C F Orr Stakes at Caulfield over 1400m in what was at the time, a very strong Group 1 field. Suavito went on to improve her 1400m/Caulfield record, winning the Orr Stakes against group 1 winners Lucky Hussler,  Hucklebuck, Turn Me Loose, Fawkner and many other notable runners. 2 weeks later, Suavito backed up her Orr Stakes win with a 3rd placing in the 2016 Futurity Stakes, finishing behind Turn Me Loose and Stratum Star. After her first up win in the Orr Stakes, Suavito was invited to run in the  HKJC Champions Mile held in May, but unfortunately, due to a drop in form she was forced to have a break after unplaced efforts in the Australian Cup and Queen of the Turf Stakes.

In Spring 2016, Suavito only ran two starts, a 6th placing in the P B Lawrence Stakes behind Miss Rose Delago, and a 10th placing, in what would be her last career start at Moonee Valley in the Dato' Tan Chin Nam Stakes, behind Awesome Rock.

Retirement 
In spring 2016, Suavito was sold to Waikato Stud in New Zealand, and is to be served by Savabeel this coming season.

Career wins and placings

References 

2010 racehorse births
Racehorses trained in Australia
Racehorses bred in New Zealand
Thoroughbred family 3-e